Darko "Cunja" Jelčić (born 1 January 1965 in Zenica, SR Bosnia and Herzegovina, SFR Yugoslavia) is a Bosnian musician best known for having been Crvena Jabuka's drummer from 1985 to 2017.

Jelčić was born in Zenica on New Year's Day, 1965. As a child, he loved to listen to records (notably folk artists such as Safet Isović, Kemal Monteno, and Halid Bešlić) as well as bands such as Indexi. At only 13 or 14 years of age, his uncle bought him a drum kit as a Christmas present, and Jelčić quickly learned to play drums without anyone showing him anything.

In 1974, Jelčić relocated to Sarajevo with his family, and formed the band Flott. While the band was mostly progressive pop, and a great influence on the Yugoslav musical scene, they were not too successful, and disbanded after having been together for less than ten years.

In the 1980s as the New Primitives movement was taking over, and Flott coming apart, Jelčić began to hang around various bars in hopes of getting attracted. In the meantime, he released two solo albums: Cunja in 1983, and Isti Život (The Same Life) in 1984.

In April 1985, Jelčić was invited to audition for a band who was looking for a drummer. This would eventually form what is known today as Crvena Jabuka. The band released their debut album in the spring of the following year, and it proved to be a great success. Following the release of the album, Crvena Jabuka headed off for their first show in Mostar. However, disaster struck, the band took two cars, and a car accident occurred killing both bassist Aljoša Buha, and singer/guitarist Dražen Ričl.

In memory of the two late members, Crvena Jabuka (as did many other bands) held a tribute concert at Skenderija in Sarajevo on 10 October 1986. While the band meant to go on a one-year hiatus of silence, they decided to go back into the studio and finish up what would be their second studio album Za sve ove godine as a tribute to Buha and Ričl. The band worked as a three-piece band for this album and the rest of the '80s.

Jelčić took most of the time in the war off, but released another studio album Ploce u Prozoru (Records in the Window) in 1990.

In 1994, Dražen Žerić rejoined forces with Jelčić and decided it was time to reconstruct Crvena Jabuka. After the reconstruction, they had major success once again with a more adult-oriented sound as opposed to their 1980s style of music.

Jelčić released two more albums: Cunja 2 in 1997, and Sve Najbolje (All The Best) in 1999.

Discography

Flott
 Flott – 1974
 Ljubav u Zatvoru (Love in Prison) – 1978
 Zivot je Ljep (Life is Beautiful) – 1979
 Kosa u Suncu (Hair in the Sun) – 1981
 Live...For the First Time – 1982
 More Live Music – 1984
 Flott-The Best Of – 1985

Crvena Jabuka

Studio albums
Crvena jabuka – 1986
Za sve ove godine (For all these Years) – 1987
Sanjati (To Dream) – 1988
Tamo gdje ljubav počinje (Where the Love Begins) – 1989
Nekako s' proljeca (In the Springtime) – 1991
U tvojim očima (In Your Eyes) – 1996
Svjet je lopta sarena (The World is a Colorful Ball) – 1998
Sve sto sanjam (Everything I Dream) – 2000
Tvojim zelama Voden (Led by Your Wishes) – 2002
Oprosti sto je ljubavna pjesma (Forgive me for this Love Song) – 2005
Dusa sarajeva (The Soul of Sarajevo) – 2007
Volim te (I Love You) – 2009

Live albums
Uzmi me kad hoces ti (Take me when you want To) – 1990
LIVE – 1998
Riznice Sjecanja – 1999

Compilations
Ima Nesto od Srca do Srca (There is Something from heart to Heart) – 1993
Moje Najmilije (My Dearest) – 1997
Antologija (The Anthology) – 2003
Zlatna Kolekcija (The Golden Collection) – 2005

Solo
Cunja – 1983
Isti Zivot (Same Life) – 1984
Ploce u Prozoru (Records in the Window) – 1989/1990
Cunja II – 1997
Bez Kraja-Sve Najbolje (Without an end, All the Best) – 1999(compilation)
Dame i Gospodo (Ladies and Gentlemen) – 2002 (Boxed set with music by Flott, Crvena Jabuka, and Darko Jelčić)

References

1965 births
Living people
Musicians from Zenica
Bosnia and Herzegovina rock drummers